The 2016 Etihad Airways GAA World Games was a global competition of Gaelic football, hurling, and camogie run by the Gaelic Athletic Association (GAA), featuring teams from six continents. This was the 2nd GAA World Games and the first to be played in Ireland, with the first ever tournament played in Abu Dhabi the previous summer. The opening ceremony and throw in was held on August 6 at Croke Park, while the majority of the games were held at University College Dublin from 9 August to 11 August 2016, with the finals being played on Friday, 12 August 2016 at Croke Park.

The GAA's four main sports (men's Gaelic football), ladies' Gaelic football, hurling and camogie (women's version of hurling) were featured at the event. Each sport consisted of two separate tournaments: one for native players (born and raised in the country they are competing for) and one for Irish born players (born in Ireland before emigrating to whatever team they are playing for), creating a total of 8 separate competitions.

Each game has 9 players a side with 9 minutes a half. As the tournament progresses the game time increases to 12 minutes a half in the knockout and then 15 minutes a half in the shield, plate and final games. This is different to the usual game which has 15 players a side with 30 minutes a half. During the four days 254 games were played with the 8 finals being played in Croke Park. With the games at UCD having free entry

The games were not broadcast live but Irish language public broadcaster TG4 later broadcast highlights, features and interviews of the tournament in December that year. The program was also made available on TG4 Player, the broadcasters on demand streaming network. The opening and closing ceremonies were televised around the world.

Teams
Over 1,100 competitors from 56 teams within 20 countries, stretching 6 continents took part in the event. Most of these competitors are Irish people living abroad, but up to a third of them are foreign born players. China and South Africa competed with completely non-Irish teams.

Africa
South Africa Gaels

Middle East
Abu Dhabi na Fianna
Middle East
Oman GAA

Asia
Beijing
Asia

Australia
Australasia

Europe
Britain
Brittany (France)
Croydon (London)
Europe
Father Murphy's (London)
France
Galicia (Spain)
Germany
Jersey
Parnells (London)
Tara (London)
Thomas McCurtains
Tir Chonail Gaels (London)

North America
Canada Eastern
Canada Toronto
Canada Western
NACB Chicago
NACB Eire Og San Francisco
New York
North America

South America
Argentina

Format

Preliminary round robin
Teams were put into groups of 3 or 4 for the preliminary stage and played off in a double or single round-robin format respectively. The top team from each group of three and the top two from each group of four would go into the Cup play-offs on Wednesday while any team that did not qualify for the Cup play-offs would go into the Shield play-offs on Wednesday.
The hurling competitions were the only exceptions, where there was only one group of three in both the native and Irish divisions, therefore there was no shield competition, and the top two from each of those groups went into the finals on Friday.

Wednesday Cup play-offs
In both ladies' football divisions, camogie and the men's football Irish division, there was only one Cup play-off group. The teams in it competed in a round-robin format with the top two going into the finals on Friday. Any team that did not finish in the top 2 went into the Plate play-offs on Thursday.
Due to the large number of teams in the men's native football, there were two Cup play-off groups with the top team from each going into the final on Friday, all other teams to not qualify for the final went into the Plate play-offs on Thursday.

Wednesday Shield play-offs
Similar to the Cup Playoffs, the Shield play-offs were contested in a round-robin format with the top team in each group going into the Shield final on Thursday, any team that did not qualify for the Shield final went into the Plate Playoffs on Friday.

Friday Cup Finals
The Cup Finals were played on Friday, August 12 at Croke Park. Eight finals were played in total from going from 11AM to 5PM.

Results

The results show are all the results for the camogie and men's native hurling games. Then also all the results of the finals.

Camogie

Group A

Group B

Group C

Cup play-offs

Native Cup Final

Cup Final

Shield play-offs

Shield Final

Plate play-offs

Quarter-finals

Semi-finals

Plate Final

Hurling

Native

|

All Final Cup Results

Camogie

Native Cup Final

Cup Final

Ladies Football

Native Cup Final

Cup Final

Hurling

Native Cup Final

Cup Final

Men's Football

Native Cup Final

Cup Final

References

Etihad
2016 in multi-sport events
August 2016 sports events in Ireland
International sports competitions hosted by University College Dublin
Etihad Airways